The following is a list of awards and nominations received by Dennis Franz.

Franz is an American film and television actor. His most notable role is portraying Detective Andy Sipowicz on the television show NYPD Blue, a role that earned Franz a record-holding four Primetime Emmy Award for Outstanding Lead Actor in a Drama Series awards. Along with the four Primetime Emmy Award wins, he also won one Golden Globe Award and three Screen Actors Guild Awards.

Along with his television awards for NYPD Blue, his final film role (to date), City of Angels, Franz received his first Saturn Award nomination for Best Supporting Actor.

In 1999, Franz received a star on the Hollywood Walk of Fame.

Motion Picture awards

Blockbuster Entertainment Awards

Saturn Awards

Television awards

Daytime Emmy Awards

Golden Globe Awards

Primetime Emmy Awards

Prism Awards

Satellite Awards

Screen Actors Guild Awards

Television Critics Association Awards

Viewers for Quality Television Awards

References

External links
 

Franz, Dennis